Club MTV, formerly MTV Dance, is a European pay television music channel from Paramount Networks EMEAA that was separated from the UK channel on 27 May 2014. It broadcasts electronica, dance and r'n'b music programming. The channel is widely available throughout Europe.

History
The channel was launched as MTV Dance on 27 May 2014

On 2 August 2015, it was removed from Sky Italia.

On 1 October 2017, MTV Dance ceased broadcasting in Benelux.

On 4 October 2018, the channel was removed on Numericable along with MTV Rocks following Comedy Central launch in France.

In 2019, the channel disappeared in Portugal being substituted by MTV Live HD.

The channel was rebranded as Club MTV from 1 June 2020. VIMN EMEA applied for a new licence for the channel on 7 April 2020.

On 1 March 2021, Club MTV expanded its broadcast area to the Middle East and North Africa through beIN Network.

On 1 July 2021, Club MTV ceased broadcasting in Russia and CIS countries.

Format
Club MTV plays a selection of dance, trance, clubhouse, electronica, drum and base, rap, r'n'b, hip-hop, techno and house music. The channel does not carry advertising.

Programmes

Regular programming
100% Party Hits!
Big Tunes!
Reload! Club Classics
Big Weekend Tunes!
Club Caliente!
Friday Club Feels
Ultimate Rap & RnB

Weekly specials

 Artist vs. Artist (alt. name: "Hottest Summer Superstar(s)" or "We Love Artist & Artist!")
 Alesso Vs Tiesto
 Gorgon City vs. Jax Jones
 Kygo vs. Marshmello
 Martin Garrix & Kygo
 Sigala vs. Jonas Blue
 The Chainsmokers vs. Alan Walker
 Avicii: Official Top 10
 Avicii: Remembering A Legend!
 David Guetta's Biggest Collabs
 50 Dance Anthems Of The 10s!
 Hands Up 4...! (alt. name: "Hottest Summer Superstar(s): Artist" or "We Love Artist!")
 David Guetta
 Calvin Harris
 Martin Garrix
 Swedish House Mafia & Beyond! (alt. name: "Hottest Summer Superstar(s): Swedish House Mafia & Beyond!")
 R&B & Hip-Hop Hits of the 00s: Official Top 50
 Clubber's Guide To the 90s! Top 50 (alt. name: Top 50 Dance Hits of the 90s)
 Clubber's Guide To the 00s! Top 50 (alt. name: Top 50 Dance Hits of the 00s)
 Ultimate 50 Ibiza Anthems
 Ultimate 50 Party Hits of the 10s

Yearly events

Valentine's Day
When Love Takes Over! 50 Loved-Up Dance Anthems

Women's Day
International Women's Day... Big Tunes
Club Classics From the Girls!
Ultimate RnB From the Girls!
 Diva Dance Vocals! (March 8, 2022)

Europe Day
 Encore 50 Fois! 90s Eurodance Hits
 00s Eurodance: 50 Big Ones
 Eurodance of the 10s: Top 50

Pride Month
Pride Dance Party: Top 50!

Men's Day
Biggest R&B And Hip-Hop From The Boys! Top 20
Biggest Dance From The Boys! Top 50

New Year
New Year's Party!
Happy New Year From Club MTV!

Other

January 2022
 MTV 80s Party Zone
 Joel Corry's Top 20 Dance Anthems of the 10s!

August 2022
Isle Of MTV: Malta 2022

September 2022
 R'n'B & Hip Hop
 20 R'n'B and Hip Hop Hits Of the 90s
 20 R'n'B and Hip Hop Hits Of the 00s
 20 R'n'B and Hip Hop Hits Of the 10s
 20 R'n'B and Hip Hop Hits Of the 20s

October 2022
Chilled: Mood Boosting Music

November 2022
EMA Nominated 2022!

December 2022
New Year Party!

January 2023
Legends
50 Legends Of Dance Music!
50 Stars Of R&B & Hip-Hop!
20 Latino Stars!
Superstar DJs!

Discontinued
AM Rush
After Dark
All Time Anthems
Dance Doubles
EDM Anthems
Essential Mix
I Got Mashed
If Your Name's Not Down
The Interactive Chart
MTV Dance by Day
MTV Dance by Night
Non-Stop Bangerz! (alt. name: "Ibiza Is Open! Non-Stop Bangerz!")
Reggaeton Beats
S***hot Videos
Sunset Sessions
The Comedown
The Work Out Plan
Top 10 At 10
Videography
Weekender
Drum 'n' Bass Mondays
Trance Tuesdays
Electro Wednesdays
House Thursdays
Feelgood Friday
Oblivion
Biggest Club Hits Of 2021: Top 50!
50 Biggest Dance Hits Of 2022!
2022's Biggest R&B & Hip-Hop Hits: Top 10
Miami Ultra 2022: The Headliners!

Availability
The channel is registered with RRTV in the Czech Republic, where it is registered to broadcast in Albania, Andorra, Belgium, Belarus, Bosnia and Herzegovina, Bulgaria, Montenegro, Czech Republic, Denmark, Estonia, Finland, France, Croatia, Ireland, Iceland, Kosovo, Cyprus, Liechtenstein, Lithuania, Latvia, Serbia, Malta, Moldova, Monaco, Germany, Netherlands, Norway, Poland, Portugal, Algeria, Angola, Benin, Botswana, Burkina Faso, Burundi, Chad, Djibouti, Egypt, Eritrea, Ethiopia, Gabon, Gambia, Ghana, South Africa, South Sudan, Cameroon, Cape, Congo (Brazzaville), Congo (Kinshasa), Eswatini, Lesotho, Liberia, Libya, Madagascar, Malawi, Mali, Morocco, Mauritius, Mauritania, Mozambique, Namibia, Niger, Ivory Coast, Equatorial Guinea, Rwanda, Senegal, Seychelles, Sierra Leone, Somalia, Central African Republic, Sudan, São Tomé and Príncipe, Tanzania, Togo, Tunisia, Uganda, Zambia, Kazakhstan, Kyrgyzstan, Tajikistan, Turkmenistan and Uzbekistan. However, the channel may not be available in all countries listed.

Logos

References

External links
 TV Guide
 MTV Dance Europe - presentation, screenshots
 Club MTV Europe - presentation, screenshots
 Společnost MTV Networks získala licenci pro tři další kanály

Dance music television channels
MTV channels
Television channels and stations established in 2014
Television channels in North Macedonia
Television channel articles with incorrect naming style